Jordan Matthews (Born July 14, 2002) is an American soccer player who plays for the South Carolina Gamecocks in the NCAA Division I.

Club career 
On July 24, 2019, Matthews appeared for Atlanta United 2, the USL Championship affiliate of Atlanta United FC, starting in a 2–2 draw with Charlotte Independence.

References

External links

2002 births
Living people
American soccer players
Association football defenders
Atlanta United 2 players
Soccer players from Georgia (U.S. state)
USL Championship players